The following is a list of notable deaths in May 2016.

Entries for each day are listed alphabetically by surname. A typical entry lists information in the following sequence:
Name, age, country of citizenship and reason for notability, established cause of death, reference.

May 2016

1
Hamzat Ahmadu, 91–92, Nigerian diplomat, Ambassador to the Soviet Union, Netherlands, Cameroon, the Bahamas, and the United States.
Richard Gilpin, 76, British Anglican priest, Archdeacon of Totnes (1996–2005).
Jean-Marie Girault, 90, French politician, Mayor of Caen (1970–2001).
Solomon W. Golomb, 83, American mathematician and engineer.
Madeleine Lebeau, 92, French actress (Casablanca, 8½), complications from a broken thigh bone.
Merv Lincoln, 82, Australian Olympic middle-distance runner (1956, 1960).
Sydney Onayemi, 78, Nigerian-born Swedish DJ.
Doug Raney, 59, American jazz guitarist, heart failure.
Swasti Mitter, 76, Indian development economist.

2
Balwantrai Bhatt, 94, Indian composer and musician.
Basil Blackshaw, 84, Northern Irish artist.
Tobias de Boer, 85, Dutch scientist.
Jonathan Cainer, 58, British astrologer (Daily Mail), heart failure.
Richard Davis, 66, English radio astronomer.
Walter Dürst, 89, Swiss ice hockey player, Olympic bronze medalist (1948).
Mozibur Rahman Fakir, 69, Bangladeshi politician, cardiac arrest.
Al Ferrari, 82, American basketball player (St. Louis Hawks, Chicago Zephyrs).
John Kaye, 60, Australian politician, member of the New South Wales Legislative Council (since 2007), cancer.
Jacky Lee, 77, American football player (Denver Broncos, Kansas City Chiefs), Alzheimer's disease.
Balraj Madhok, 96, Indian politician, President of Bharatiya Jana Sangh (1966–1967).
Tomohiro Matsu, 43, Japanese light novel writer (Listen to Me, Girls. I Am Your Father!, Mayoi Neko Overrun!), liver cancer.
Paul McDowell, 84, British actor and singer (The Temperance Seven).
Myles McKeon, 97, Irish-born Australian Roman Catholic prelate, Bishop of Bunbury (1969–1982).
Roger Millward, 68, British rugby league player (Hull Kingston Rovers, Castleford Tigers, national team).
Karel Pečko, 95, Slovenian artist.
Stasys Petronaitis, 83, Lithuanian actor.
Afeni Shakur, 69, American businesswoman (Tupac Amaru Shakur Center for the Arts, Amaru Entertainment, Makaveli Branded) and political activist (Black Panthers).
Fernando Soto Aparicio, 82, Colombian author.
Wilfried Straub, 77, German football official.
Gordie Sundin, 78, American baseball player (Baltimore Orioles).

3
Charlie Beamon, 81, American baseball player (Baltimore Orioles).
Paul Boutelle, 81, American politician, Socialist Workers candidate for U.S. Vice President (1968), kidney cancer.
Ian Deans, 78, Canadian politician, MP (1980–1986), Parkinson's disease.
Kristian Ealey, 38, British actor (Brookside, Hollyoaks).
Fan Lichu, 82, Chinese bridge structural engineer and academician (Chinese Academy of Engineering).
Abel Fernandez, 85, American actor (The Untouchables, Pork Chop Hill).
Marianne Gaba, 76, American model and actress (Missile to the Moon, The Choppers, The Beverly Hillbillies), brain cancer.
Gao Shan, 53, Chinese geochemist and academician (Chinese Academy of Science).
Tadeusz Gocłowski, 84, Polish Roman Catholic prelate, Archbishop of Gdańsk (1992–2008), stroke.
Sarah D. Grant, 72, American judge.
Sunil Gudge, 56, Indian cricketer (Maharashtra), heart attack.
Kaname Harada, 99, Japanese World War II flying ace, multiple organ failure.
Frank Levingston, 110, American supercentenarian, nation's oldest World War II veteran.
Thomas W. Libous, 63, American politician, member of the New York State Senate (1989–2015), cancer.
Karol Machata, 88, Slovak actor (St. Peter's Umbrella).
Graeme McCall, 78, Australian Olympic rower.
Allan L. McCutcheon, 66, American sociologist and statistician. 
Nicolas Noxon, 79, American filmmaker (Secrets of the Titanic), pancreatic cancer.
Ian Quigley, 84, New Zealand politician, MP for Otago Central (1972–1975).
Carl Fredrik Reuterswärd, 81, Swedish artist (Non-Violence), pneumonia.
Ian Sander, 68, American producer and director (Ghost Whisperer, Profiler, I'll Fly Away), heart attack.
Domingo Siazon Jr., 76, Philippine politician and diplomat, Secretary of Foreign Affairs (1995–2001), ambassador to Austria and Japan.
Jadranka Stojaković, 65, Bosnian singer-songwriter, motor neuron disease.
Gordon Strachan, 68, Scottish rugby union player, cardiac amyloidosis.
Janusz Tazbir, 87, Polish historian.

4
Tutty Alawiyah, 74, Indonesian politician, Minister for Women's Affairs (1998–1999).
Ángel de Andrés López, 64, Spanish actor (What Have I Done to Deserve This?, 800 Bullets, Taxi).
Blas Avena, 32, American mixed martial artist (WEC), suicide.
Sir Jack Baer, 91, British art dealer.
Jean-Baptiste Bagaza, 69, Burundian politician, President (1976–1987).
Bob Bennett, 82, American politician, U.S. Senator from Utah (1993–2011), pancreatic cancer and stroke.
Gaetan Boucher, 59, Canadian-born Swiss Olympic ice hockey player (1988), (HC Villars).
Karl Butzer, 81, German-born American geographer.
Michael Caborn-Waterfield, 86, British businessman (Ann Summers).
Giuseppe Faraca, 56, Italian racing cyclist.
Howard King, 83, American public address announcer (Michigan Stadium).
Olle Ljungström, 54, Swedish singer and guitarist.
Ursula Mamlok, 93, German-born American composer.
James Oyedeji, 63, Ghanaian sports historian.
Paul A. Paddock, 41, American artist. 
Jordan Parsons, 25, American mixed martial artist (Bellator), traffic collision.
Rita Renoir, 82, French strip-teaser and actress. 
Friedrich Schattleitner, 92, Austrian Olympic sport shooter (1968).
Ret Turner, 87, American fashion designer (Cher, Dolly Parton, Carol Burnett).
Adlan Varayev, 54, Russian wrestler, Olympic silver medalist (1988), drowned.
John Wright, 75, British Army officer and polo administrator.

5
Wan Mohammad Khair-il Anuar, 56, Malaysian politician, MP (since 2013), Chairman of Malaysian Palm Oil Board, helicopter crash.
Benito Cocchi, 81, Italian Roman Catholic prelate, Archbishop of Modena-Nonantola (1996–2010).
Bentot Jr., 46, Filipino actor.
Rollin Dart, 90, American banker (Dart National Bank).
Matt Irwin, 36, British celebrity photographer, suicide.
Noriah Kasnon, 52, Malaysian politician, MP (since 2004), helicopter crash.
Sylvia Kauders, 94, American actress (Inside Llewyn Davis, Witness, Predator 2), heart attack.
Bill MacDermott, 79, American CFL coach (Edmonton Eskimos).
Anne Atai Omoruto, 59, Ugandan physician, cancer.
Romalı Perihan, 74, Turkish actress and singer.
Fred C. Robinson, 85, American academic. 
Siné, 87, French political cartoonist.
Gabriel Thohey Mahn-Gaby, 88, Burmese Roman Catholic prelate, Archbishop of Yangon (1971–2002).
Isao Tomita, 84, Japanese synthesizer musician, composer and arranger (Snowflakes Are Dancing), heart failure.
Martha Seim Valeur, 93, Norwegian politician, Deputy MP (1993–1997).
Nancy Zahniser, 67, American pharmacologist, glioblastoma.

6
Klaus Ampler, 75, German Olympic racing cyclist (1968).
Johannes Bauer, 61, German trombonist.
Nico de Bree, 71, Dutch footballer (NEC, Anderlecht), cancer.
Scott Burgess, 57, Australian actor, (Water Rats), heart attack.
Patrick Ekeng, 26, Cameroonian footballer (Le Mans, Dinamo București, national team), heart attack.
Dick Estell, 90, American radio host (The Radio Reader).
Roberta Gellis, 88, American author.
Reg Grundy, 92, Australian television production mogul (Reg Grundy Organisation).
David Hall, 85, American politician, Governor of Oklahoma (1971–1975), stroke.
Lakshmi Holmström, 81, Indian-born British author and translator.
Margot Honecker, 89, East German politician, Minister of People's Education (1963–1989), First Lady (1976–1989).
Johnny Joannou, 76, American politician, member of the Virginia House of Delegates (1976–1983, 1998–2016) and Senate (1984–1992), lung cancer.
Candye Kane, 54, American blues singer-songwriter and pornographic actress, pancreatic cancer.
Li Wanheng, 92, Chinese soldier, commander of the 67th Army of the People's Liberation Army (1981–1983).
George Mandler, 91, American psychologist.
Pierre, 33, American penguin, renal failure.
Larry Pinto de Faria, 83, Brazilian footballer (Sport Club Internacional).  
Niklaus Schilling, 72, Swiss filmmaker (The Expulsion from Paradise).
Kōjō Tanaka, 91, Japanese photographer.
Abu Waheeb, 29–30, Iraqi field commander (ISIL) and prison escapee (Camp Bucca), airstrike.
Christopher Wathes, 64, British research scientist.
Valeriy Zuyev, 63, Ukrainian football player (Dynamo Kyiv) and manager.

7
Fernando Álvarez de Miranda, 92, Spanish politician, President of the Congress of Deputies (1977–1979).
Comply or Die, 16, British thoroughbred racehorse, won the Grand National (2008).
Ann Day, 77, American politician, member of the Arizona Senate (1990–2000), traffic collision.
Merritt Green, 85, American lawyer and judge. 
Michael S. Harper, 78, American poet.
Mohammad-Ali Hosseinzadeh, 39, Iranian politician, traffic collision.
John Krish, 92, British film director.
Gonzalo López Marañon, 82, Spanish-born Ecuadorian Roman Catholic prelate, Vicar Apostolic of San Miguel de Sucumbíos (1970–2010).
José Roberto Marques, 70, Brazilian footballer (São Paulo).
Chris Mitchell, 27, Scottish footballer (Queen of the South, Clyde), suicide by jumping in front of train.
Bernardo Ribeiro, 26, Brazilian footballer (Skënderbeu, Newcastle Jets, IFK Mariehamn), cardiac arrest.
George Ross, 73, Scottish footballer (Preston North End).
John Stabb, 54, American punk singer (Government Issue), stomach cancer.
Nikita Struve, 85, French literary critic and publisher.
Anne van den Ban, 88, Dutch agricultural economist.
Khurram Zaki, 40, Pakistani rights activist, shot.

8
Tom M. Apostol, 92, American analytic number theorist and professor.
Philippe Beaussant, 86, French author.
John Bradshaw, 82, American self-help writer, heart failure.
Tonita Castro, 63, Mexican-born American actress (Dads, Funny People, The Book of Life), stomach cancer.
Louisa Chase, 65, American painter.
Sir Iain Glidewell, 91, British jurist, Lord Justice of Appeal (1985–1995).
Ken Gorgal, 87, American football player (Cleveland Browns, Chicago Bears).
Gareth Gwenlan, 79, British television producer (Only Fools and Horses).
Joan Helpern, 89, American shoe designer.
Nick Lashaway, 28, American actor (Girls, In Time, The Last Song), traffic collision.
Elisa Mainardi, 85, Italian actress (Fellini Satyricon).  
Wolfgang Patzke, 57, German footballer.
Geneviève Salbaing, 94, French-born Canadian dancer and choreographer.
William Schallert, 93, American actor (The Patty Duke Show, The Many Loves of Dobie Gillis, In the Heat of the Night), President of SAG (1979–1981).
Rajesh Nandini Singh, 59, Indian politician, member of the Lok Sabha (2009–2014), heart attack.
Friedrich von Huene, 87, German-born American woodwind maker.
John Young, 67, American baseball player (Detroit Tigers), founder of Reviving Baseball in Inner Cities.
Thomas Zhang Huai-xin, 90, Chinese clandestine Roman Catholic prelate, Bishop of Jixian (since 1981).

9
Chuck Curtis, 80, American football coach (University of Texas at Arlington).
Andi Muhammad Ghalib, 69, Indonesian politician, Attorney General (1998–1999), Ambassador to India (2008–2013).
Rex Hughes, 77, American basketball coach (Sacramento Kings).
Walther Leisler Kiep, 90, German politician, member of the Bundestag (1965–1976, 1980–1982).
Sandy Lewis, 85, Australian politician.
Bill MacIlwraith, 88, British playwright and screenwriter (Two's Company). 
Karl Maramorosch, 101, Austrian-born American virologist, entomologist and plant pathologist.
Dennis Nineham, 94, British theologian.
Chennamaneni Rajeshwara Rao, 92, Indian politician.
Kelly Stearne, 57, Canadian curler.
Gijs Verdick, 21, Dutch professional cyclist, heart attack.
Ronald W. Walker, 76, American historian, lymphoma. 
John Warr, 88, English cricketer.

10
Mustafa Badreddine, 55, Lebanese military commander (Hezbollah, Syrian Civil War), convicted planner of 1983 Kuwait bombings, explosion.
Heinz-Georg Baus, 82, German billionaire and businessman, owner of Bauhaus AG.
Jack Boothman, 79, Irish sports administrator, President of the Gaelic Athletic Association (1994–1997).
Sally Brampton, 60, British writer and magazine editor (Elle), suicide by drowning.
Sarah Corp, 41, British television producer, lung cancer.
Nicholas Fisk, 92, British children's author.
Carlos García y García, 88, Peruvian politician, Second Vice President (1990–1992).
Louis van Gasteren, 93, Dutch filmmaker and artist.
Gene Gutowski, 90, Polish-born American film producer (The Pianist, The Fearless Vampire Killers, Cul-de-sac), pneumonia.
Ilkka Hanski, 63, Finnish ecologist.
*Kang Young-hoon, 93, South Korean politician, Prime Minister (1988–1990).
Mark Lane, 89, American lawyer, author (Rush to Judgment, Plausible Denial) and screenwriter (Executive Action), heart attack.
Thomas Luckmann, 88, Slovene-born American sociologist (The Social Construction of Reality).
François Morellet, 90, French painter, sculptor and light artist.
Betty Sabo, 87, American artist.
*Shi Ping, 82, Chinese aircraft designer (Hongdu JL-8) and academic (Chinese Academy of Engineering).
Steve Smith, 26, Canadian mountain biker, race collision.
Riki Sorsa, 63, Finnish singer ("Reggae OK"), cancer.
Margaret Walker, 91, British sprinter.

11
Peter Behrens, 68, German drummer (Trio), multiple organ failure.
Bobby Carroll, 77, Scottish footballer (Celtic).
Tony Cozier, 75, Barbadian cricket writer and commentator.
Katherine Dunn, 70, American writer (Geek Love), lung cancer.
Abdul Baqi Jammoh, 93–94, Jordanian politician, Senator (1997–2001).
David King, 73, British graphic designer, art collector and writer (The Commissar Vanishes).
Promode Mankin, 77, Bangladeshi politician.
Anton Muheim, 99, Swiss politician, President of the National Council (1973–1974).
Motiur Rahman Nizami, 73, Bangladeshi politician and convicted war criminal, leader of Jamaat (since 2000), MP for Pabna (1991–1996, 2001–2006), execution by hanging.
Herman Obermayer, 91, American journalist and publisher (Northern Virginia Sun).
Jim Pothecary, 82, South African cricketer (Western Province, national team).
Michael Ratner, 72, American lawyer, won right of habeas corpus for Guantanamo Bay detainees, complications from cancer.
Majid al-Shibl, 80–81, Saudi Arabian announcer.
Joe Temperley, 86, Scottish saxophonist (Jazz at Lincoln Center Orchestra), cancer.
Jack L. Treynor, 86, American economist.

12
Mike Agostini, 81, Trinidadian-born Australian Olympic sprinter (1956), Commonwealth Games gold medalist (1954).
Prince Alexander of Yugoslavia, 91, Serbian royal.
Denise Bernot, 94, French academic.
Sidney Brazier, 96, British army bomb disposal officer. 
Ulf Grenander, 92, Swedish statistician.
Denis Hardy, 80, Canadian politician, Vice President of the National Assembly of Quebec (1970–1973).
Susannah Mushatt Jones, 116, American supercentenarian, world's oldest living person.
Bohumil Kubát, 81, Czech wrestler, Olympic bronze medalist (1960). 
Julius La Rosa, 86, American pop singer ("Anywhere I Wander", "Eh, Cumpari!") and actor (Another World).
Del Latta, 96, American politician, member of the United States House of Representatives from Ohio's 5th congressional district (1959–1989).
Peter J. Liacouras, 85, American academic, President of Temple University (1981–2000).
Giuseppe Maiani, 92, Sammarinese politician, Captain Regent (1955–1956, 1982).
Tapio Mäkelä, 89, Finnish cross-country skier, Olympic gold medalist (1952). 
Giovanni Migliorati, 73, Italian-born Ethiopian Roman Catholic prelate, Vicar Apostolic of Awasa (since 2009).
Yukio Ninagawa, 80, Japanese film and theatre director, pneumonia.
Raghunath Patnaik, 89, Indian politician, heart disease.
Georges Sesia, 91, French footballer.
Hugh Smith, 81, American football player (Washington Redskins).

13
Seiji Arikawa, 86, Japanese politician, member of the House of Representatives (1990–1993).
Bill Backer, 89, American advertising executive (McCann Erickson) and songwriter ("I'd Like to Teach the World to Sing (In Perfect Harmony)").
Khamidbi M. Beshtoev, 73, Russian physicist.
Ondrej Binder, 46, Slovak politician, member of the National Council (2016), traffic collision.
Buster Cooper, 87, American jazz trombonist, prostate cancer.
Karl Eigen, 88, German farmer and politician, member of the Bundestag (1972–1976, 1980–1990).
Sammy Ellis, 75, American baseball player (Cincinnati Reds), cancer.
Rodrigo Espíndola, 26, Argentine footballer (Nueva Chicago), shot.
Makiko Futaki, 57, Japanese animator (Akira, Spirited Away, My Neighbour Totoro).
David McNiven Garner, 87, New Zealand oceanographer.
Blanche Hartman, 90, American Buddhist abbess.
W. K. Hastings, 85, Canadian statistician.
Doina Florica Ignat, 78, Romanian historian and politician, Senator (1992–1996).
John Imbrie, 90, American paleoceanographer.
Paul Jetton, 51, American football player (Cincinnati Bengals, New Orleans Saints).
Lauri Kähkönen, 69, Finnish politician, MP for North Karelia (1999–2011).
Rabbit Kekai, 95, American surfer.
Jan Korger, 78, Czech physician and politician, member of the House of Peoples of the Federal Assembly of Czechoslovakia (1992).
Engelbert Kraus, 81, German footballer (Kickers Offenbach).
Mikio Kudō, 55, Japanese baseball player, liver failure.
Dick McAuliffe, 76, American baseball player (Detroit Tigers), World Series winner (1968), Alzheimer's disease.
Howard Meeks, 83, American Episcopal prelate, Bishop of Western Michigan (1984–1988).
Fredrik Norén, 75, Swedish jazz drummer.
Pinuccio Sciola, 74, Italian sculptor and muralist. 
James M. Shuart, 85, American academic administrator, President of Hofstra University (1976–2001), heart disease.
Baba Hardev Singh, 62, Indian spiritual guru, traffic collision.
Murray A. Straus, 89, American sociologist and professor (University of New Hampshire).

14
Larry Barnes, 84, American football player.
Tony Barrow, 80, British press officer (The Beatles).
Balázs Birtalan, 46, Hungarian author, cancer.
Darwyn Cooke, 53, Canadian comic book artist (Catwoman, The Spirit, DC: The New Frontier), cancer.
John Coyle, 83, Scottish footballer (Dundee United).
Ron Henry, 79, American baseball player (Minnesota Twins), cardiovascular and renal disease.
Jesús Leguina, 73–74, Spanish jurist, justice of the Constitutional Court (1986–1992) and director of the Bank of Spain (1994–2001).
Valerie Lush, 97, British actress.
Jaroslav Malina, 78, Czech scenographer and painter, heart attack.
Lasse Mårtenson, 81, Finnish singer ("Laiskotellen"), cerebral hemorrhage.
Malachi Mitchell-Thomas, 20, English motorcycle racer, injuries sustained in race collision.
Banza Mukalay, 63, Congolese politician, Minister of Culture (since 2014).
Christy O'Connor Snr, 91, Irish golfer.
Marjet Ockels, 72, Dutch politician, member of the House of Representatives (1991–1994).
Kenneth Painter, 81, English archaeologist and curator.
Johnny Seay, 75, American country music singer.
Paul Smoker, 75, American jazz trumpeter.
Monteagle Stearns, 91, American diplomat, Ambassador to Greece (1981–1985) and Ivory Coast (1976–1979).
Charles R. Stelck, 98, Canadian geologist.
Neculai Alexandru Ursu, 89, Romanian linguist, philologist and literary historian.
André Wicky, 87, Swiss racing driver and team owner.
Alvise Zorzi, 93, Italian journalist and author.

15
Hakkı Akansel, 92, Turkish military officer and politician, Mayor of Istanbul (1980–1981).
Oya Aydoğan, 59, Turkish actress, model and television presenter, aortic aneurysm.
Erika Berger, 76, German television presenter and author.
André Brahic, 73, French astrophysicist, discovered rings of Neptune, cancer.
Ghulam Sadiq Khan, 76, Indian classical vocalist.
Robert C. T. Lee, 92, Chinese-born American veterinarian.
Jane Little, 87, American musician (Atlanta Symphony Orchestra).
Clovis Maksoud, 89, American diplomat, Ambassador of the Arab League to the United Nations (1979–1990) and the United States (1979–1990), cerebral hemorrhage.
Bobby McIlvenny, 89, Northern Irish footballer (Oldham Athletic).
Cauby Peixoto, 85, Brazilian singer, pneumonia.
Ken Ramos, 48, American baseball player (Houston Astros), suicide by gunshot.
Michael Roberds, 52, Canadian actor (The New Addams Family, Elf, Hot Tub Time Machine).
Marion Tournon-Branly, 91, French architect.

16
Hussein Sheikh Abdirahman, 75, Somali politician, Minister of Defense (1989–1990). (death announced on this date)
Sir Gavyn Farr Arthur, 64, British judge, Lord Mayor of London (2002–2003).
Moidele Bickel, 79, German costume designer (La Reine Margot).
Anthony Bird, 85, British Anglican priest and academic. 
Ken Cameron, 74, Scottish trade union leader. 
Giovanni Coppa, 90, Italian Roman Catholic cardinal, Apostolic Nuncio (1979–2001).
Camille DesRosiers, 87, Canadian-born Tuvaluan Roman Catholic prelate, Superior of Funafuti (1986–2010).
Huguette Dreyfus, 87, French harpsichordist.
Robert Freeman, 82, American politician, Lieutenant Governor of Louisiana (1980–1988).
Romaldo Giurgola, 95, Italian-born American-Australian architect (Parliament House, Canberra).
Aar de Goede, 87, Dutch politician, member of the House of Representatives (1967–1973), State Secretary of Finance (1973–1977), member of the European Parliament (1979–1984).
Mitsuo Horiuchi, 86, Japanese politician.
Sadek Khan, 82, Bangladeshi journalist and filmmaker. 
François Maistre, 91, French actor (Angélique, Marquise des Anges, The Discreet Charm of the Bourgeoisie).
Jim McMillian, 68, American basketball player (Los Angeles Lakers, Buffalo Braves, New York Knicks), NBA champion (1972), complications from heart failure.
Julia Meade, 90, American actress (The Ed Sullivan Show, Pillow Talk).
Gillian Mears, 51, Australian writer (Foal's Bread), multiple sclerosis.
Emilio Navaira, 53, American country and Tejano singer (Life Is Good), heart failure.
Noriko Nishimoto, 75, Japanese-born Australian puppeteer, cancer.
Michael Pope, 89, British Olympic hurdler.
Mamie Rallins, 74, American hurdler, traffic collision.
David Rendel, 67, British politician, MP for Newbury (1993–2005), cancer.
Bjarne Saltnes, 82, Norwegian politician. 
Ivaylo Sharankov, 82, Bulgarian Olympic swimmer.
Deepak Shodhan, 87, Indian cricketer, lung cancer.
Lino Toffolo, 81, Italian actor (Yuppi du, Brancaleone at the Crusades) and singer.
Jack Unruh, 80, American commercial illustrator.
Oscar Whitbread, 86, English-born Australian television producer.

17
Seán Ardagh, 68, Irish politician, TD (1997–2011).
Guy Clark, 74, American folk singer-songwriter ("Desperados Waiting for a Train", "Workbench Songs", "My Favorite Picture of You"), Grammy winner (2014), cancer.
Benjamin de Roo, 76, Dutch-born Australian Olympic gymnast (1960, 1964).
Vinjamuri Seetha Devi, Indian folk singer.
Paulo Emilio, 80, Brazilian football manager.
*Kim Jae-soon, 92, South Korean politician, Speaker of the National Assembly (1988–1990).
Ed Kolenovsky, 87, American photographer (Associated Press).
Alexandru Lăpușan, 61, Romanian politician, mayor of Dej (1991), MP (1992–1994) and Minister of Agriculture (1992–1996).
Edmund V. Ludwig, 87, American federal judge, member of the District Court for the E.D. of Pennsylvania (since 1985).
Yūko Mizutani, 51, Japanese voice actress (Digimon, Black Jack, Tenchi Muyo!), breast cancer.
Xavier de Planhol, 90, French geographer.
Arthur Provis, 91, English cinematographer and producer.
Müzahir Sille, 84, Turkish wrestler, Olympic champion (1960).
Yuri Volkov, 79, Russian ice hockey player (Krylya Sovetov Moscow, HC Dynamo Moscow, national team).

18
Elaine Abraham, 86, American Tlingit elder and nurse.
Luis H. Álvarez, 96, Mexican industrialist and politician, President of the National Action Party (1987–1993).
Ethel Bush, 100, British police officer.
Eduardo Castrillo, 73, Filipino sculptor, cancer.
Adrian Flowers, 89, British photographer.
Astrid Gunnestad, 77, Norwegian journalist.
Ida Pedanda Gede Made Gunung, 63, Indonesian Hindu priest.
Zygmunt Kukla, 68, Polish footballer.
Adán Nigaglioni Loyola, 86, Puerto Rican doctor and educator.
Kornél Pajor, 92, Hungarian Olympic speed skater (1948), world champion (1949).
Sutham Phanthusak, 69, Thai businessman and politician.
Michael Reichmann, 71, Canadian photographer and blogger.
Boris Schnaiderman, 99, Ukrainian-born Brazilian translator, writer and essayist.
Fritz Stern, 90, German-born American historian.
Susan Tolchin, 75, American political scientist, ovarian cancer.
Ian Watkin, 76, New Zealand actor (Braindead, Sleeping Dogs, Charlotte's Web).
*Doris Yankelewitz Berger, 82, Costa Rican artist and politician, First Lady (1982–1986).

19
Alexandre Astruc, 92, French film critic and director.
Irving Benson, 102, American actor and comedian.
Cook, 15, Spanish Jack Russell Terrier dog actor (Aquí no hay quien viva, La que se avecina, TV commercials of Loterías y Apuestas del Estado), cardiac arrest.
Ronald C. Davidson, 74, Canadian physicist, complications from pneumonia.
Jan Deutsch, 80, American philosopher and legal scholar. 
George Forty, 88, British Army officer and author.
Jim Ray Hart, 74, American baseball player (San Francisco Giants).
Hugh Honour, 88, British art historian.
Hu Hongwen, 91, Chinese organic chemist and academician (Chinese Academy of Sciences).
Cindy Nicholas, 58, Canadian long distance swimmer and politician, liver cancer.
Rogelio Ordoñez, 75, Filipino author, liver cancer.
N. S. Palanisamy, 75, Indian politician, complications from kidney failure.
Laxminarayan Pandey, 88, Indian politician, member of the Lok Sabha for Mandsaur (1971–1979, 1989–2009).
Marco Pannella, 86, Italian politician and civil rights activist, MEP (1979–2009).
Morley Safer, 84, Canadian-born American journalist (60 Minutes), pneumonia.
John Sisko, 57, American sculptor.
Donald Snelgrove, 91, British Anglican clergyman, Bishop of Hull (1981–1994).
Alan Young, 96, English-born Canadian-American actor (Mister Ed, The Time Machine, DuckTales).

20
Gert Bals, 79, Dutch footballer (PSV, Ajax).
Glen Clegg, 82, Canadian politician.
Patricia M. Derian, 86, American human rights activist, Alzheimer's disease.
Vasile Duță, 60, Romanian lawyer and politician, Senator (2000–2004), lung cancer.
John David Jackson, 91, Canadian physicist.
Gabriel, 75, Russian prelate, Archbishop of the Russian Orthodox Church.
Brandon Grove, 87, American diplomat, ambassador to East Germany and Zaire, cancer.
Rosanna Huffman, 77, American actress (Babe, Oliver & Company, Murder, She Wrote), pancreatic cancer.
Kang Sok-ju, 76, North Korean diplomat and politician, Foreign Minister (2007), esophageal cancer.
Pranlal Kharsani, 89, Indian actor.
Kho Jabing, 32, Malaysian convicted murderer, executed by hanging.
Tsuyoshi Makino, 70, Japanese author, critic and social activist.
Joe McDonagh, 62, Irish sports administrator, President of the Gaelic Athletic Association (1997–2000).
Audrey Purton, 90, British Women's Royal Army Corps officer. 
Miguel de la Quadra-Salcedo, 84, Spanish journalist and athlete.
Ádám Rajhona, 72, Hungarian actor.
Lucille Stone, 90, American baseball player (All-American Girls Professional Baseball League), complications from hydrocephalus.
Albert M. Sackett, 95, American Navy rear admiral.
Yagya Datt Sharma, 80, Indian politician, member of the Madhya Pradesh Legislative Assembly.
Robyn Sisman, 66, American-born British publisher and author. 
Bogdan Ulmu, 65, Romanian theatre director, writer and publicist.
Wheelock Whitney, Jr., 89, American sports executive (Minnesota Twins, Minnesota North Stars, Minnesota Vikings).

21
Gaston Berghmans, 90, Belgian comedian and actor (The Silent Hedonist).
Lorne Clarke, 87, Canadian lawyer, Chief Justice of the Nova Scotia Supreme Court (1985–1998).
Andrea Maria Erba, 86, Italian Roman Catholic prelate, Bishop of Velletri-Segni (1988–2006).
Jane Fawcett, 95, British codebreaker at Bletchley Park during World War II, key figure in the sinking of the Bismarck.
Sir Denys Henderson, 83, British businessman, chairman of ICI (1987–1995).
Homeboykris, 9, American racehorse.
Eddie Keizan, 71, South African racing driver.
Tony Kriletich, 72, New Zealand rugby league player (Auckland, national team).
Alan Lewis, 61, British footballer (Reading, Derby County, Peterborough United).
Akhtar Mansour, c. 48, Afghan Islamist, Minister of the Emirate for Aviation and Tourism (1996–2001), leader of the Taliban (since 2015), airstrike.
Nick Menza, 51, German-born American drummer (Megadeth), heart failure.
Germán Serrano Pinto, 76, Costa Rican politician, Vice President (1990–1994).
Norman Tait, 75, Canadian First Nations artist, cancer.
Sándor Tarics, 102, Hungarian water polo player, Olympic gold medalist (1936).

22
Lucjan Avgustini, 52, Albanian Roman Catholic prelate, Bishop of Sapë (since 2006).
Adolf Born, 85, Czech painter, illustrator, caricaturist and filmmaker.
Malvina Cheek, 100, British war artist.
Merv Cowan, 91, Australian WANFL footballer.
Tom DeLeone, 65, American football player (Cleveland Browns, Cincinnati Bengals), brain cancer.
Intikhab, 22, American racehorse, heart disease.
John Lyons, 90, British trade union leader.
José Luis Romo Martín, 62, Mexican artist.
Alexis Navarro, 69, Venezuelan politician and diplomat, Governor of Nueva Esparta (2000–2004), Ambassador to Russia (2005–2008), heart attack.
Yasushi Niki, 90, Japanese baseball player.
Leonorilda Ochoa, 76, Mexican actress (Los Beverly de Peralvillo), Alzheimer's disease.
Subhash Pal, 40, Indian mountaineer.
Arulraj Rosli, 75, Malaysian Olympic racing cyclist (1964).
Velimir Sombolac, 77, Serbian-Yugoslav football player, Olympic champion (1960) and manager.
George Wildman, 88, American cartoonist.
Bata Živojinović, 82, Serbian actor (Walter Defends Sarajevo), complications from gangrene.

23
Nurjahan Begum, 90, Bangladeshi journalist.
Jo Beverley, 68, British-born Canadian writer, cancer.
John Brophy, 83, Canadian ice hockey player and coach (Birmingham Bulls, Toronto Maple Leafs, Hampton Roads Admirals), namesake of John Brophy Award.
Joe Fleishaker, 62, American actor (Citizen Toxie: The Toxic Avenger IV, Late Show with David Letterman), heart attack.
Vera Henriksen, 89, Norwegian writer.
Cedric McKinnon, 48, American football player (Cleveland Thunderbolts, Tampa Bay Storm).
Zdeněk Mézl, 81, Czech print-maker.
Sir Reginald Palmer, 93, Grenadian politician, Governor-General (1992–1996).
Nanette Rainone, 73, American feminist and reporter.
Arne Sandnes, 92, Norwegian politician.

24
Ray Ash, 79, Canadian football player (Winnipeg Blue Bombers).
Suzanne Corkin, 79, American neuroscientist, liver cancer.
*Adelina Dematti de Alaye, 88, Argentinian human rights activist, founder of the Mothers of the Plaza de Mayo.
Khaleda Ekram, 65, Bangladeshi architect, non-Hodgkin’s lymphoma.
Lewis Fiander, 78, Australian actor (Pride and Prejudice, Who Can Kill a Child?, Bangkok Hilton), stroke.
Maycie Herrington, 97, American historian and social worker.
Buck Kartalian, 93, American actor (Planet of the Apes, Cool Hand Luke, The Rock).
Malik Iqbal Mehdi Khan, 64, Pakistani politician, MP (since 2013), liver disease.
Burt Kwouk, 85, British actor (The Pink Panther, Last of the Summer Wine, Goldfinger), cancer.
Frankie Laine, 73, Canadian professional wrestler, multiple sclerosis.
Mell Lazarus, 89, American cartoonist (Miss Peach, Momma).
Anne-Marie Nzié, 84, Cameroonian singer.
Hughes Oliphant Old, 83, American theologian.
Leo Proost, 82, Belgian racing cyclist.
Jorma Salmi, 83, Finnish Olympic ice hockey player (1960), (Ilves, Frölunda HC).
Berrick Saul, 91, British economist and academic administrator.
Soita Shitanda, 56, Kenyan politician, MP from Malava (since 1997).
Bé Udink, 90, Dutch politician and CEO.

25
Giacomo Barabino, 88, Italian Roman Catholic prelate, Bishop of Ventimiglia-San Remo (1988–2004).
Horacio Ernesto Benites Astoul, 82, Argentinian Roman Catholic prelate, Auxiliary Bishop of Buenos Aires (1999–2008).
Cassandra Butts, 50, American lawyer.
Lloyd Campbell, 101, Canadian curler.
Nancy Dow, 79, American actress (The Ice House) and model.
Ian Gibson, 73, Scottish footballer (Cardiff City, Coventry City, Middlesbrough).
Gyula Kosice, 92, Czechoslovakian-born Argentine poet and sculptor.
Ku Chin-shui, 56, Taiwanese Olympic decathlete (1984), plasma cell leukemia. 
Per Øien, 78, Norwegian flutist.
Valentin Petry, 88, German racing cyclist.
Bob Sorenson, 92, New Zealand rugby union player and coach (Auckland), and cricketer (Auckland).
Peggy Spencer, 95, British dancer.
József Tempfli, 85, Romanian-Hungarian Roman Catholic prelate, Bishop of Oradea Mare (1990–2008). 
John Webster, 60, British theologian.
Yang Jiang, 104, Chinese playwright, author, and translator.

26
Kazimierz Barburski, 73, Polish fencer, Olympic bronze medalist (1968).
Loris Francesco Capovilla, 100, Italian Roman Catholic cardinal, Prelate of Loreto (1971–1988).
Esad Čolaković, 46, Macedonian footballer (FK Sloga Jugomagnat). 
Ted Dumitru, 76, Romanian football manager (Kaizer Chiefs, Mamelodi Sundowns, New York Apollo), heart attack.
Steve Edwards, 85, American professor.
Hedy Epstein, 91, German-born American Holocaust survivor and political activist (International Solidarity Movement), cancer.
Lou Grasmick, 91, American baseball player (Philadelphia Phillies) and businessman.
Noel Harding, 69, Canadian contemporary artist, heart failure.
Iana Kasian, 30, Ukrainian prosecutor and murder victim.
Robert O'Hearn, 94, American set designer.
Gustav Meier, 86, Swiss-born American conductor, cancer.
Wanaro N'Godrella, 66, French tennis player.
Angela Paton, 86, American actress (Groundhog Day, American Wedding, Lolita), heart attack.
Arturo Pomar, 84, Spanish chess grandmaster.
Coe Swobe, 87, American politician, member of the Nevada Senate (1966–1974).
Bob Williams, 86, American football player (Chicago Bears).

27
Chen Nengkuan, 93, Chinese metal and detonation physicist and academician (Chinese Academy of Sciences).
Michael Dann, 94, American television executive (CBS).
Jean-Claude Decaux, 78, French billionaire advertiser, CEO of JCDecaux.
Louise Erickson, 86, American baseball player (Racine Belles, Rockford Peaches). 
Gaylord T. Gunhus, 76, American army officer, Chief of Chaplains of the United States Army (1999–2003).
Gerhard Harpers, 88, German footballer (Sodingen, national team).
Kai G. Henriksen, 60, Norwegian businessman (Vinmonopolet).
R. G. Jadhav, 83, Indian literary critic.
František Jakubec, 60, Czech football player.
Marshall "Rock" Jones, 75, American bass player (Ohio Players).
George Klir, 84, Czech computer scientist.
Bonnie Law, 47, Hong Kong singer and actress (Happy Ghost), heart attack.
Leroidesanimaux, 15, Brazilian-born American racehorse, Eclipse Award winner, complications from accident.
Petro Herkulan Malchuk, 50, Moldovan-born Ukrainian Roman Catholic prelate, Archbishop of Kyiv-Zhytomyr (since 2011), heart attack.
Jaap Metz, 74, Dutch politician, member of the House of Representatives (1982–1986).
Frank Modell, 98, American cartoonist (The New Yorker).
Henrietta Phipps, 84, British landscape gardener.
La Ferne Price, 90, American ballplayer (All-American Girls Professional Baseball League).
Girolamo Prigione, 94, Italian Roman Catholic prelate, Apostolic Nuncio (1968–1997).
Ivor Robinson, 92, British-born American physicist.
Rocco Sollecito, 67, Italian-born Canadian gangster (Rizzuto crime family), shot.
*Wang Shizhen, 100, Chinese nuclear medicine physician and academician (Chinese Academy of Sciences), Father of Chinese nuclear medicine.
*Wang You-theng, 89, Taiwanese entrepreneur (Rebar), traffic collision.
Morton White, 99, American philosopher and historian.

28
Giorgio Albertazzi, 92, Italian actor (Last Year at Marienbad) and film director.
Stanley Burke, 93, Canadian television journalist (The National News).
David Cañada, 41, Spanish cyclist, race collision.
Alexander DeConde, 95, American historian.
Bryce Dejean-Jones, 23, American basketball player (New Orleans Pelicans), shot.
Peter DeTroy, 68, American attorney, heart attack.
M. Brendan Fleming, 90, American politician, Mayor of Lowell, Massachusetts (1982–1984).
John Willison Green, 89, Canadian journalist.
Harambe, 17, American-bred western lowland gorilla, shot.
C. Michael Harper, 88, American executive (ConAgra Foods).
Christian Kay, 76, British lexicographer.
Joanneke Kruijsen, 47, Dutch politician, member of the House of Representatives (2003–2006).
Marion Lambert, 73, Belgian-born Swiss art collector, injuries sustained in traffic collision.
Michael McCurdy, 74, American illustrator and publisher.
Patrick Neill, Baron Neill of Bladen, 89, British barrister and life peer.
Eddie O'Hara, 78, British politician, MP for Knowsley South (1990–2010).
Wolf-Dieter Oschlies, 63, German Olympic rower.
Floyd Robinson, 83, American country singer.
Devarakonda Vittal Rao, 68, Indian politician.

29
Kenne Fant, 93, Swedish actor, director and author, President of Svensk Filmindustri (1963–1980).
T. Marshall Hahn, 89, American academic administrator, President of Virginia Tech (1962–1974).
Henryk Kempny, 82, Polish footballer.
Ralph Ketner, 95, American businessman and philanthropist, co-founder of Food Lion, colon cancer.
Svetozar Koljević, 85, Serbian author, historian, translator and professor.
Mathew Mattam, 65, Indian Malayalam author.
Don McNay, 57, American financial author.
Edward Morris, 75, British art historian.
K. P. Noorudeen, 76, Indian politician, cerebral hemorrhage.
André Rousselet, 93, French businessman and politician, member of the National Assembly (1967–1968).
David Tod Roy, 83, American sinologist and translator (Jin Ping Mei).

30
Jan Aas, 72, Norwegian footballer (Fredrikstad).
Gérson Bergher, 91, Brazilian politician.
Boniface Choi Ki-San, 68, South Korean Roman Catholic prelate, Bishop of Incheon (since 2002).
Javare Gowda, 100, Indian writer, heart failure.
James Knepper, 84, American politician.
Tom Lysiak, 63, Canadian ice hockey player (Atlanta Flames, Chicago Blackhawks), leukemia.
Rick MacLeish, 66, Canadian ice hockey player (Philadelphia Flyers), meningitis and multiple organ failure.
Erkin Vohidov, 79, Uzbek poet, playwright and translator.

31
Mohamed Abdelaziz, 68, Sahrawi politician, President (since 1976), lung cancer.
Corry Brokken, 83, Dutch singer ("Net als toen"), Eurovision Song Contest 1957 winner.
Jules Browde, 97, South African lawyer and human-rights activist.
James Campbell, 81, English historian.
Jan Crouch, 78, American televangelist and broadcasting executive (Trinity Broadcasting Network), complications from a stroke.
Olav Djupvik, 85, Norwegian politician. 
Reshad Feild, 82, English mystic and musician (The Springfields).
Sergio Adolfo Govi, 81, Italian Central African Roman Catholic prelate, Bishop of Bossangoa (1978–1995).
Antonio Imbert Barrera, 95, Dominican politician, President (1965).
Carla Lane, 87, English television writer (The Liver Birds, Butterflies, Bread).
Gene Logsdon, 84, American farmer and author.
Rupert Neudeck, 77, German journalist and humanitarian (Cap Anamur), complications from heart surgery.
Peter Owen, 89, German-born British publisher.
Rudra Madhab Ray, 78, Indian politician, kidney disease.
Ghislaine Roquet, 90, Canadian nun and academic.
Pam Royds, 91, British publisher.

References

2016-05
 05